Tristan Alexander Robbins (born 26 May 1996) is a British road racing cyclist, who currently rides for UCI Continental team .

Major results

2012
 National Track Championships
1st  Youth points race
3rd Junior points race
2013
 1st Junior Tour of the Mendips
2014
 1st  Road race, National Junior Road Championships
 National Track Championships
1st  Junior points race
4th Points race
2015
 1st John Walker Memorial Road Race
 1st Under-23 Talent Cup, Six Days of London
 1st Kalas Cup
 2nd South Region Road Race
2016
 1st Betty Pharoah Memorial Legstretchers Road Race
 1st Kalas Cup
2017
 1st Scorpion CS Road Race
 1st Noel Jones Memorial Road Race
 2nd Team pursuit, BUCS National Track Championships
2018
 1st Club team rider, Grande prémio de ciclismo Mortágua
 2nd Road race, BUCS National Road Championships
 2nd Kalas Cup
2019
 5th Ryedale Grand Prix

References

External links
 
 
 
 

British male cyclists
1996 births
Living people
Sportspeople from Bristol